Moskvitino is a rural locality (a selo) and the administrative center of Moskvitinsky Selsoviet of Svobodnensky District, Amur Oblast, Russia. The population is 425 as of 2018.

Geography 
The village is located on the right bank of the Golubaya River, 26 km north-west from Svobodny.

References 

Rural localities in Svobodnensky District